Er (Р р; italics: Р р) is a letter of the Cyrillic script.

History
The Cyrillic letter er was derived from the Greek letter Rho (Ρ ρ).

In the Cyrillic numeral system, er had a value of 100.

Form
The Cyrillic letter Er (Р р) looks similar to the Greek letter Rho (Ρ ρ), and the same as the Latin letter P (П in Cyrillic).

Usage
As used in the alphabets of various languages, р represents the following sounds:
 palatalized alveolar trill 

The pronunciations shown in the table are the primary ones for each language; for details consult the articles on the languages.

Related letters and other similar characters
Ρ ρ/ : Greek letter rho
R r : Latin letter R
P p : Latin letter P
₽ : Russian ruble sign
П п : Cyrillic letter П

Computing codes

External links

References